Inga cabelo is a species of plant in the family Fabaceae. It is found only in Brazil.

External Link
https://www.gbif.org/species/5357753

References

cabelo
Flora of Brazil
Endangered plants
Taxonomy articles created by Polbot